Lipinia zamboangensis, also known as the Zamboang lipinia or rusty tree skink, is a species of skink endemic to Mindanao, the Philippines.

References

Lipinia
Reptiles of the Philippines
Endemic fauna of the Philippines
Reptiles described in 1963
Taxa named by Walter Creighton Brown
Taxa named by Angel Chua Alcala